Kurunjang is a suburb in Melbourne, Victoria, Australia,  west of Melbourne's Central Business District, located within the City of Melton local government area. Kurunjang recorded a population of 10,711 at the 2021 census.

Education

The suburb contains three schools: Kurunjang Primary School, Kurunjang Secondary College and Heathdale Christian College.

Recreation

Located in the south of the suburb is Kurunjang Recreation Reserve, home to the Satellite City Soccer Club. Adjacent to that are six tennis courts. North-west of Kurunjang Recreation Reserve is the French Athletic and Track field and the Melton Hockey ground. In the north-west of the suburb, there is Pennyroyal park, which has some playground facilities and open space. There is a planned active open space area with a football oval and some tennis courts, which will be located on the currently empty space on Dalray Crescent.

In the south-east of the suburb, there is the Little Blind Creek Reserve, which has some playground facilities. In the east of the suburb, there is a park on the corner of Kirkton Drive and Victoria Avenue. In the north-east of the suburb, there is a large park off Archer Drive, with playground facilities and a basketball court.

In the far north there is an equestrian centre.

References

Suburbs of Melbourne
Suburbs of the City of Melton